Betty of Greystone is a 1916 American silent drama film directed by Allan Dwan and produced by the Fine Arts Film Company. It was distributed by Triangle Film Corporation. The film starred Dorothy Gish and Owen Moore. It was partly filmed at Fort Lee, New Jersey. An incomplete print of the film is housed at the EYE Film Institute Netherlands.

Cast
Dorothy Gish as Betty Lockwood
Owen Moore as David Chandler
George Fawcett as Jim Weed
Norman Selby as Weed's son (credited as Kid McCoy)
Kate Bruce 
Albert Tavernier
John Beck
Warner Richmond
Grace Rankin
Macey Harlam (credited as Macey Harlan)
Eugene Ormonde
Leonore Harris

References

External links

1916 films
American silent feature films
American black-and-white films
Triangle Film Corporation films
Silent American drama films
1916 drama films
Films directed by Allan Dwan
1910s American films